"To All the Girls I've Loved Before" is a song written by Hal David (words) and Albert Hammond (music).  It was originally recorded by Hammond in 1975 on his album 99 Miles From L.A., but is more famous for a 1984 recording by Julio Iglesias and Willie Nelson, which appeared on Iglesias's album 1100 Bel Air Place. A breakthrough for Iglesias in the English language market, the song peaked at No. 5 on the Billboard Hot 100 and No. 1 on the Canadian RPM Top Singles chart. "To All the Girls I've Loved Before" went to number one on the country chart, and was one of two entries on the country chart for Julio Iglesias and Willie Nelson as a duo (the second was "Spanish Eyes", which peaked at No. 8 in late 1988).

Background
David and Hammond created the song in 1975 and registered it with the US Copyright Office on April 28 of that year.  Following Bobby Vinton's recording released on October 9, 1980, the song was registered as published in the US.

Commercial performance
The song was Iglesias' biggest hit in the United States and Canada, and Nelson's biggest European hit. The record also appeared on the Australian, New Zealand and South African charts. The song has become Iglesias's signature English-language tune, prominently performed at his concerts since the single's release. Thanks to this song, 1100 Bel Air Place became Iglesias' worldwide best-selling album. In 1984, Nelson and Iglesias were also named "duo of the year" by the Country Music Association, and "To All the Girls I've Loved Before" was named single of the year by the Academy of Country Music.

Charts and certifications

Charts

Year-end charts

Certifications

Cover versions

In English:
Julio Iglesias
Bobby Vinton
Merle Haggard
Tom Jones
Hamilton Camp (The 13 Ghosts of Scooby-Doo)
Albert Hammond (original)
Engelbert Humperdinck
Ray Dylan
Steve Ivings 
Alanis Morissette. Willie Nelson played rhythm guitar on the recording.
 In Spanish
Il Divo, the vocal quartet of male singers; Swiss tenor Urs Buhler, Spanish baritone Carlos Marin, American tenor David Miller and French pop singer Sébastien Izambard, along with Colombian producer winner of multiple Grammy Latino Julio Reyes Copello, recorded the song for the album Amor & Pasión from Il Divo (2015).
In Dutch
 Henk Wijngaard and Ben Steneker recorded "Aan elke vrouw waar 'k eens van hield" in 1984.
In Polish
 Krzysztof Krawczyk and Bohdan Smoleń recorded "Dziewczyny, które mam na myśli" in 1985; adopted by Jarek Adam.
 Bogusław Mec and Zbigniew Wodecki recorded "Dziewczyny, które kochaliśmy" in 1984.
  In Czech
 "Už mi lásko není dvacet let" by Jiří Zmožek from 1990
  In Slovak
 "Všetkým dievčatám" by Michal Dočolomanský and Peter Stašák from 1994

References

1975 songs
1984 singles
Julio Iglesias songs
Willie Nelson songs
Alanis Morissette songs
Merle Haggard songs
Bobby Vinton songs
Male vocal duets
Billboard Hot Country Songs number-one singles of the year
Songs written by Albert Hammond
Songs with lyrics by Hal David
Song recordings produced by Richard Perry
RPM Top Singles number-one singles
Number-one singles in Belgium
Columbia Records singles
Pop ballads
Songs about old age
Songs about nostalgia